Museums in the Cook Islands include:

 Cook Islands National Museum
 Te Ara - Museum of Cultural Enterprise
 Cook Islands Library & Museum
 Pa Ariki's Takitumu Palace Museum
 Bergman Gallery

Cook Islands
Museums
Museums
Cook